Ronald Hutchinson may refer to:

Ron Hutchinson (ice hockey) (born 1936), ice hockey player
Ron Hutchinson (jockey) (born 1927), jockey
Harry Tate (Ronald Macdonald Hutchison, 1872–1940), English comedian
Ron Hutchinson (screenwriter), screenwriter and playwright
Ronald R. Hutchinson, behavioral scientist and plaintiff in Hutchinson v. Proxmire

See also
Ron Hutchison (born 1964), Canadian professional wrestler, trainer and promoter